Mark Andrew Labbett (born 15 August 1965), also known by his professional nickname The Beast, is an English quizzer and television personality. Since 2009 he has been one of the "chasers" on the ITV game show The Chase as "The Beast" and from late February 2022 rejoined the Australian version of the show.
He previously appeared between 2013 and 2015 on GSN's American version as their sole chaser; between 2016 and 2020 as one of six chasers on the Australian version; and as one of four chasers in the second season of ABC's American revival.

Labbett has appeared as a contestant on several other television quiz shows and is a regular in quizzing competitions.

Early life 
Mark Andrew Labbett was born on 15 August 1965 in Tiverton, Devon, to Carolyn and Jon Labbett. He attended Bishop Wordsworth's School in Salisbury.

Labbett obtained a Master of Arts degree in mathematics from Exeter College, Oxford, a Postgraduate Certificate in Education (PGCE) in secondary education from the University of Exeter and legal CPE and LPC qualifications from the University of Glamorgan (now the University of South Wales).

Career

Teaching 
Labbett was a mathematics and physical education supply teacher at Caldicot School in Caldicot, Monmouthshire, South Wales.

Quizzing 
Labbett became interested in quizzing when working at Butlins holiday camp, where he supplemented his income with winnings from the quiz machines. His pub quiz team won a weekend in Paris in April 2001 after competing in the national competition Jumbo Quiz.

Labbett appeared on Mastermind in 1999, where his specialist subject was the Olympic Games. He appeared again on Mastermind in 2000, with the animated television show The Simpsons as his specialist subject. Also in 2000, he competed on Countdown, narrowly losing his first game on a crucial conundrum. In 2001, he appeared on Stake Out, where he was the second contestant eliminated during the Face Off round. In 2003, he appeared on Grand Slam, where he lost against Clive Spate in his first match.

In 2004, he won £500 on the Channel 5 show BrainTeaser, and a year later he won £1,500 on BBC One's SUDO-Q. He appeared on Who Wants to be a Millionaire? twice, firstly on fastest finger first in Series 18 broadcast on 5 November 2005. He returned the following series (19) and made the hot seat, winning £32,000 across two episodes in April 2006. In 2005, he also won £32,000 on Millionaire Live, a live version of Who Wants to Be a Millionaire? that toured seaside resorts throughout the summer.

As captain, he led the Welsh quiz team to fifth place in the 2006 European Quizzing Championships.

Labbett's team, the Rugby Boys, won BBC Four's Only Connect in 2009. Other television appearances include The National Lottery People's Quiz (2007) where he came second in the grand final, University Challenge (1996-7) where he reached the quarter finals as captain of the Glamorgan University team, and Are You an Egghead?

In 2012, Labbett was ranked 89th in the World Quizzing Championships.

In 2016, Labbett took part in the three-part ITV series Sugar Free Farm, when he revealed he has false teeth, as a result of eating too much sugar. That same year, it was announced that he would become a producer for Hull-based wrestling promotion New Generation Wrestling (NGW).

The Chase 

Labbett is one of the "chasers" in the ITV teatime quiz The Chase, first broadcast in 2009 and hosted by Bradley Walsh. In the show, his nickname is "The Beast", a two-pronged nickname referencing both his stature and his surname (Labbett sounds like the French la bête, meaning "the beast").

In August 2013, Labbett appeared as the only chaser on the American version of The Chase on Game Show Network. He also appeared as one of the seven chasers on the Australian version of The Chase on the Seven Network, alongside fellow UK chasers Anne Hegerty and Shaun Wallace. His weakest subjects are horse racing and soap operas. He noted that the American version posed far more difficulties for him, as American game shows typically allow far more competent contestants than British or Australian shows.

Labbett joined ABC's US revival of The Chase for its second season. Although ABC had considered adding Labbett to the show with its first season, his contract was not renewed for the third.

Personal life 
Labbett moved to Caldicot, Monmouthshire, in 1998 and then to nearby Newport in 2003 before moving to Moorgate, Rotherham, in 2013.
Labbett married his second cousin in 2014, who is 27 years his junior.

Labbett supports Sheffield United.

Television

Guest appearances 
University Challenge (1996-7) – contestant
Mastermind (1999, 2000) – contestant
Countdown (2000) – contestant
Stake Out (2001) – contestant
Grand Slam (2003) – contestant
BrainTeaser (2004) – contestant
SUDO-Q (2005) – contestant
Who Wants to Be a Millionaire? (2006) – contestant
The National Lottery People's Quiz (2007) – contestant
Are You an Egghead? (2008) – contestant
Battle of the Brains (2008) – contestant
Only Connect (2009) – contestant
Sugar Free Farm (2016) – participant
Tipping Point: Lucky Stars (2016) – contestant
Let's Sing and Dance for Comic Relief (2017) – participant winner
Celebrity Juice (2017) – participant
Loose Women (2017) – guest

References

External links 

1965 births
People from Tiverton, Devon
Alumni of the University of Exeter
Alumni of Exeter College, Oxford
Alumni of the University of Glamorgan
English television personalities
Living people
Contestants on British game shows
Contestants on University Challenge
Mass media people from Devon
People from Rotherham